This page describes the final meetings of the 2010 Individual Speedway Junior World Championship.

The 2010 FIM Speedway Under 21 World Championship Final meeting took place from July 17 to October 2, 2010. In a new format approved by the International Motorcycling Federation (FIM), there will be three final meetings with fourteen permanent riders and two wild cards and two track reserves. The permanent riders was determined in five Qualifying Round and two Semi-Finals.

Final One - Gdańsk, Poland 
17 July 2010
 Gdańsk
Zbigniew Podlecki Stadium (Length: 349 m)
Referee:  Jim Lawrence
Jury President:  Armando Castagna
Beat Time: 65.00 - Vadim Tarasenko in Heat 2
Attendance: 1,000 (rain)
References 
only 12 heats (rain)

Heat after heat:
 (66,30) Pavlic, Laguta, Mroczka, Wölbert (R4)
 (65,00) Tarasenko, Andersson, Facher, Sperz (F)
 (66,00) Bogdanovs, Dudek, Vaculík, Bach
 (65,94) Hougaard, Ward, Janowski, Kůs
 (65,96) Laguta, Vaculík, Kůs, Andersson
 (67,78) Bogdanovs, Janowski, Facher, Wölbert (R4)
 (67,03) Pavlic, Ward, Bach, Sperz (F4)
 (66,85) Hougaard, Tarasenko, Mroczka (R3 - run by last lap), Dudek (R4)
 (66,53) Bach, Hougaard, Laguta, Facher
 (65,78) Wölbert, Dudek, Ward, Andersson
 (66,56) Janowski, Vaculík, Tarasenko, Pavlic
 (66,40) Bogdanovs, Kůs, Sperz, Mroczka

Final Two - Daugavpils, Latvia 
14 August 2010
 Daugavpils
Stadium Lokomotive (Length: 372 m)
Referee:  Mick Bates
Jury President:  Andrzej Grodzki
References

Top 8 riders in the overall classification

Final Three - Pardubice, Czech Republic 
2 October 2010
 Pardubice
Speedway track AMK Zlatá přilba Pardubice-Svítkov (Length: 391 m)
Referee:  Wojciech Grodzki
Jury President:  Armando Castagna
References

Medals Run-off 
Because after the last heat was a tie between top three riders, a run-off was decided about all medals.

See also 
 2010 Speedway Grand Prix
 2010 Team Speedway Junior World Championship

References